Edgar Wisniewski (4 September 1930, in Stolp, Germany (now Słupsk, Poland) – 25 April 2007, in Berlin) was a German architect. He was a student and later business partner of Hans Scharoun.

Life 
Wisniewski was born in 1930 as the younger of two children (his sister  was born in 1926) to architect Bruno Wisniewski and pianist Edith Wisniewski (née Berndt) in Stolp. After World War II and the subsequent expulsion of Germans from Poland, the family escaped to Berlin in September 1945. His interest in music and architecture developed at home with his parents. He justified his decision to undertake architectural studies as a "more rational solution, because architecture seemed to me less of a professional risk than music."

Wisniewski studied from 1950 to 1957 at the Technical University of Berlin with Hans Scharoun, afterwards becoming his colleague and, later, business partner. He was involved from the beginning in the planning of the urban regeneration project of the Kulturforum in Berlin. In 1963, the Berliner Philharmonie was the first building to be completed, and Wisniewski was the lead partner for this. It was followed in 1978 by the opening of the Berlin State Library. During the planning phase in 1972, Scharoun died. There was a contractual agreement between Wisniewski and Scharoun which said that in the event of the death of one or other partner, the remaining partner would continue the work.

From 1979 to 1984 the State Institute for Music Research and the Berlin Musical Instrument Museum were established. Wisniewski planned and realised the Berlin chamber music hall between 1984 and 1987 following Scharoun's original project sketches. Until then, many years of debate had taken place in the State Parliament House of Berlin until Richard von Weizsäcker, as the mayor, finally reached a decision for the construction. In addition to the central theme of "Music in the Centre", Wisniewski was particularly interested in the architectural requirements for the performance of contemporary music, e.g., through the use of mezzanine spaces for chamber music. For this he consulted with composers such as Luigi Nono, who also wrote works for the building and the possibilities it offered. The outstanding acoustics of the hall have been praised by numerous ensembles and conductors worldwide.

The fall of the Berlin Wall, which was in the immediate vicinity of the Kulturforum, and the reconstruction of the Potsdamer Platz, completely changed the overall urban building context in Berlin. A number of Scharoun's original designs were never reaslised as a result, including the Senate guest-house for artists, which was part of the competition for the construction of the state library. Nevertheless, Wisniewski continued until the end to complete his overall concept, which had many critics since the beginning and triggered numerous debates.

In addition to his work for the Berlin Kulturforum, Wisniewski also developed housing projects. In the late 1970s, he planned a terrace house group in Berlin-Schlachtensee (Kirchblick 12a-c), where Wisniewski and his family themselves lived.

After Reunification, Wisniewski planned the reconstruction and development along organic principles of post-war prefabricated buildings in the former GDR, especially in Prenzlau. Extensive plans for Neubrandenburg, however, were not realised.

Honors 
 1997: First class of the Order of Merit of the Federal Republic of Germany

Literature 
 Edgar Wisniewski: Die Berliner Philharmonie und ihr Kammermusiksaal. Der Konzertsaal als Zentralraum, Gebrüder Mann Verlag 1993. 
 Edgar Wisniewski et al.: Wege zur Musik. Herausgegeben anlässlich der Eröffnung des neuen Hauses, Staatliches Institut für Musikforschung Preußischer Kulturbesitz 1984.

References

External links 
 
 Kurzbio bei baunetz.de
 Interview mit Edgar Wisniewski, taz 25. April 2005
 Scharouns Mann fürs Künstlerische, Berliner Morgenpost, 5. Januar 2007
 Nachruf (Welt online 1. Mai 2007)
 Edgar-Wisniewski-Archiv im Archiv der Akademie der Künste, Berlin

Architects from Berlin
20th-century German architects
Modernist architects
1930 births
2007 deaths
Officers Crosses of the Order of Merit of the Federal Republic of Germany
People from Słupsk